Timothy Lancaster West, CBE (born 20 October 1934) is an English actor and presenter. He has appeared frequently on both stage and television, including stints in both Coronation Street (as Eric Babbage) and EastEnders (as Stan Carter), and also in  Not Going Out, as the original Geoffrey Adams. He is married to the actress Prunella Scales; since 2014 they have been seen travelling together on British and overseas canals in the Channel 4 series Great Canal Journeys.

Early life and education
West was born in Bradford, Yorkshire, the only son of Olive (née Carleton-Crowe) and actor Lockwood West (1905–1989). He was educated at the John Lyon School, Harrow on the Hill, at Bristol Grammar School, where he was a classmate of Julian Glover, and at Regent Street Polytechnic (now the University of Westminster).

Career
West worked as an office furniture salesman and as a recording technician, before becoming an assistant stage manager at the Wimbledon Theatre in 1956.

Stage
West played repertory seasons in Newquay, Hull, Northampton, Worthing and Salisbury before making his London debut at the Piccadilly Theatre in 1959 in the farce Caught Napping. He was a member of the Royal Shakespeare Company for three seasons: the 1962 Arts Theatre Experimental season (Nil Carborundum and Afore Night Come), the 1964 'Dirty Plays' season (Victor, the premiere production of Marat/Sade and the revival of Afore Night Come) and the 1965 season at Stratford and later at the Aldwych Theatre appearing in The Comedy of Errors, Timon of Athens, The Jew of Malta, Love's Labour's Lost and Peter Hall's production of The Government Inspector, in a company which included Paul Scofield, Eric Porter, Janet Suzman, Paul Rogers, Ian Richardson, Glenda Jackson and Peter McEnery.

West has played Macbeth twice, Uncle Vanya twice, Solness in The Master Builder twice and King Lear four times: in 1971 (aged 36) for Prospect Theatre Company at the Edinburgh Festival; on a worldwide tour in 1991 in Dublin for Second Age; in 2003 for English Touring Theatre, on tour in the UK and at the Old Vic; and in 2016 at the Bristol Old Vic.

Screen
Having spent years as a familiar face who never quite became a household name, West's big break came with the major television series, Edward the Seventh (1975), in which he played the title role from the age of twenty-three until the King's death; his real-life sons, Samuel and Joseph, played the sons of King Edward VII as children.  His father Lockwood West also portrayed King Edward VII in 1972 in an episode of the LWT television drama series Upstairs, Downstairs.  Other screen appearances have included Nicholas and Alexandra (1971), The Day of the Jackal (1973), The Thirty Nine Steps (1978), Masada (1981), Cry Freedom (1987) and Luc Besson's The Messenger: The Story of Joan of Arc (1999). In Richard Eyre's Iris (2001) he plays Maurice and his son Samuel West plays Maurice as a young man.

West starred as patriarch Bradley Hardacre in Granada TV's satirical Northern super-soap Brass over three seasons (1982–1990). West appeared in the series Miss Marple in 1985 (in A Pocket Full of Rye as the notorious Rex Fortescue), and made a memorable appearance as Professor Furie in A Very Peculiar Practice in 1986. In 1997, he played Gloucester in the BBC television production of King Lear, with Ian Holm as Lear. From 2001 to 2003, he played the grumpy and frequently volatile Andrew in the BBC drama series Bedtime.

In 1989 West played Nigel in The Thames Television Sitcom After Henry alongside his real life wife Prunella Scales who played Sarah France. They appeared together in the episode Upstagers aired on 21 March 1989.

At Christmas 2007, he joined Not Going Out as Geoffrey Adams. He reprised this role in two episodes of series three; Geoffrey Whitehead played the role in later seasons. In 2011, he appeared alongside John Simm and Jim Broadbent in BBC series Exile, written by BAFTA-winning Danny Brocklehurst.

In February 2013, West joined the cast of ITV soap Coronation Street, playing Eric Babbage. He joined the cast of EastEnders in 2013, playing Stan Carter from January 2014. He filmed his final scenes for EastEnders in February 2015.

In 2019 he played Private Godfrey in Dad's Army: The Lost Episodes, a recreation of three missing episodes of the BBC comedy Dad's Army.

Directing
West was artistic director of the Forum Theatre, Billingham, in 1973, where he directed We Bombed in New Haven by Joseph Heller, The Oz Obscenity Trial by David Livingstone and The National Health by Peter Nichols. He was co-artistic director of the Old Vic Theatre from 1980 to 1981, where he directed Trelawny of the 'Wells' and The Merchant of Venice. He was director-in-residence at the University of Western Australia in 1982.

In 2004, West toured Australia with the Carl Rosa Opera Company as director of the production of H.M.S. Pinafore, also singing the role of Sir Joseph Porter. He was replaced in the singing role by Dennis Olsen for the Perth and Brisbane performances.

Personal life
West was married to actress Jacqueline Boyer from 1956 to 1961 and has a daughter Juliet. In 1963 he married actress Prunella Scales, with whom he has two sons. Samuel West is an actor and their younger son Joseph (Joe) participated in two episodes of Great Canal Journeys filmed in France, where he lives with his French wife and their children. After the broadcast of the French canal episodes, Joe was interviewed in several newspapers.

The Guardian crossword setter Biggles referred to West's 50th wedding anniversary in its prize crossword puzzle (number 26,089) on 26 October 2013.
 
West and Scales are patrons of the Lace Market Theatre in Nottingham, The Kings Theatre in Gloucester and of the Conway Hall Sunday Concerts programme, the longest-running series of chamber music concerts in Europe. West is an Ambassador of SOS Children's Villages, an international orphan charity providing homes and mothers for orphaned and abandoned children. He currently supports the charity's annual World Orphan Week campaign which takes place each February.

West is patron of the National Piers Society, a charity dedicated to preserving and promoting seaside piers. He and Prunella Scales are patrons of Avon Navigation Trust, the charity that runs the River Avon from Stratford-upon-Avon to Tewkesbury. They both support ANT by attending the Stratford River Festival every year. West supports Cancer Research UK.

West is a supporter of the Talyllyn Railway, the first preserved railway in the world. He has visited on a number of occasions, the last being the summer of 2015 to attend the Railway's 150th anniversary. He is also a keen supporter of the Inland Waterways Association, and since 2014 has featured together with his wife in the Great Canal Journeys series for Channel 4.

West was president of the London Academy of Music and Dramatic Art (being succeeded by Benedict Cumberbatch in January 2018) and is President of The Society for Theatre Research. He is also patron of London-based drama school, The Associated Studios.

Honours
In 1984, West was appointed CBE for his services to drama.

Selected theatre 
 King Lear, as Lear, Dir Tom Morris, Bristol Old Vic, 2016
 The Vote by James Graham, Donmar Warehouse and More4, 2015
 The Handyman by Ronald Harwood, as Romka, Dir Joe Harmston, UK tour, 2012
 Uncle Vanya, as Sererbryakov, Dir Jeremy Herrin, Chichester Festival Theatre, 2012
 The Winslow Boy, as Arthur Winslow, Dir Stephen Unwin, Rose Theatre, Kingston and UK tour, 2009
 Romany Wood, as narrator, Theatre Severn, Shropshire, 2009
 The Lover/The Collection, Dir Jamie Lloyd, Comedy Theatre, London, 2008
 Opening of St Pancras International, as William Henry Barlow, Tuesday 6 November 2007
 Coriolanus as Menenius, Dir Gregory Doran, RSC, Stratford-upon-Avon, Newcastle, Spain and USA, 2007
 A Number by Caryl Churchill as Salter, with Samuel West as B1/B2/Michael Black, Dir Jonathan Munby, Crucible Theatre Studio, 2006. Revived in 2010 at the Chocolate Factory and 2011 at the Fugard Theatre, Cape Town.
 The Old Country by Alan Bennett, Dir Stephen Unwin, Trafalgar Studios, 2006
 King Lear, as Lear, Dir Stephen Unwin, UK tour with English Touring Theatre, 2002
 The Master Builder, as Solness, Dir Stephen Unwin, UK tour, 1999
 King Lear, as Gloucester, Dir Richard Eyre, Greece, Turkey and the National Theatre, 1997
 Henry IV Part One and Part Two, as Falstaff, with Samuel West as Hal, Dir Stephen Unwin, UK tour and the Old Vic Theatre, 1996
 Twelve Angry Men, Dir Harold Pinter, Bristol Old Vic and Comedy Theatre, 1996
 Macbeth, as Macbeth, Dir Helena Kaut-Howson, Theatr Clwyd, 1994
 Death of a Salesman, as Willy Loman, Dir Janet Suzman, Theatr Clwyd, 1993
 King Lear as Lear, Dir Alan Stanford, Tivoli Theatre, Dublin, 1992
 Long Day's Journey into Night, with Prunella Scales, Dir Howard Davies, Bristol Old Vic, UK Tour and the National Theatre, 1991
 Uncle Vanya, as Vanya, Dir Paul Unwin, Bristol Old Vic, 1990
 The Master Builder, as Solness, Dir Paul Unwin, Bristol Old Vic, 1989
 When We Are Married, with Prunella Scales, Dir Ronald Eyre, Whitehall Theatre, 1985
 Masterclass by David Pownall, as Stalin, Dir Justin Greene, Leicester Haymarket and the Old Vic Theatre, 1984
 Uncle Vanya, as Vanya, Dir Prunella Scales, Playhouse, Perth, Western Australia, 1982
 The Merchant of Venice as Shylock, International tour in association with the British Council and at the Old Vic Theatre, 1980
 Beecham, by Caryl Brahms and Ned Sherrin, as Thomas Beecham, Apollo Theatre, London, 1980
 The Homecoming, as Max, Garrick Theatre, Dir Kevin Billington, 1978.
 Hamlet, as Claudius, with Derek Jacobi as Hamlet, Dir Toby Robertson, Edinburgh Festival, International tour and the Old Vic Theatre, 1977
 Othello, as Iago, Dir Richard Eyre, Nottingham Playhouse, 1976
 Hedda Gabler, as Judge Brack, Dir Trevor Nunn, with Glenda Jackson, RSC, international tour and Aldwych Theatre, 1975
 Macbeth, as Macbeth, Gardner Centre, Brighton, Dir John David, 1974
 Love's Labour's Lost, as Holofernes, Aldwych Theatre, London, McBain/Archer, Prospect Theatre Company, June 1972
 King Lear as Lear, Prospect Theatre Company, Dir Toby Robertson, Edinburgh Festival and UK tour, 1971. The production visited Australia in 1972
 Exiles, Dir Harold Pinter. Mermaid Theatre, 1970
 Richard II and Edward II, as Bolingbroke and Young Mortimer, with Ian McKellen as the kings, Prospect Theatre Company, Edinburgh Festival, International tour and Piccadilly Theatre, Dir Richard Cottrell/Toby Robertson, 1969
 The Tempest, as Prospero, Prospect Productions, Dir Toby Robertson, 1966
 "Madam", said Dr Johnson, Prospect Productions, Dir Toby Robertson, 1966
 Marat/Sade, RSC, Dir Peter Brook, 1964
 Afore Night Come, RSC, Arts Theatre, 1962. Revived at the Aldwych Theatre, 1964
 Gentle Jack, Theatre Royal, Brighton and the Queen's Theatre, London, 1963
 Caught Napping, Piccadilly Theatre, 1959

Filmography

Film

Television

Selected radio 

Timothy West was a member of the BBC Radio Drama Repertory Company in 1962 and has taken part in over 500 radio broadcasts. In 1959, he wrote and produced a short audio play, This Gun That I Have in My Right Hand Is Loaded, satirising typical mistakes of radio drama, including over-explanatory dialogue and misuse of sound cues.

Cabin Pressure by John Finnemore, as Gordon Shappey, BBC Radio 4, 2011
Seasons by Gareth Parker, as Harold. Independent drama by the Wireless Theatre Company, 2010
The Man on the Heath: Johnson and Boswell Investigate by David Noakes, as Doctor Johnson, Saturday Play on BBC Radio 4, 2005
Lorna Doone by R.D. Blackmore, as narrator, 2004
Rumpole of the Bailey, as Rumpole, in sixteen 45-minute plays, 2003–2012. In this series his wife in real life played his fictional wife.
Hecuba by Euripides, as Polymestor, 2001 
Groupie by Arnold Wesker, 2001
Dorothy, a Manager's Wife by Peter Tinniswood, 2000
Death of a Salesman by Arthur Miller, as Willy Loman, 1993
The Gibson by Bruce Bedford, 1992
The Expedition of Humphry Clinker by Tobias Smollett, Classic Serial on BBC Radio 4, 1992 
Crisp and Even Brightly by Alick Rowe, as 'Generally well-intentioned King Wenceslas', Saturday Night Theatre, BBC Radio 4, 1987
I, Claudius and Claudius the God by Robert Graves, as Claudius, produced by Glyn Dearman, 1985
With a Whimper to the Grave by Wally K. Daly, as 642, 1984 
Actors, or Playing for Real by Lope de Vega, as Emperor Diocletian, BBC Radio 3, 1983 
Lady Windermere's Fan by Oscar Wilde, Saturday Night Theatre, BBC Radio 4, 1982 
Operation Lightning Pegasus by Alick Rowe, as Agammemnon, Saturday Night Theatre, BBC Radio 4, 1981 
Sherlock Holmes v. Dracula by Loren D. Estleman, as Doctor Watson, dramatised and directed by Glyn Dearman, Saturday Night Theatre, BBC Radio 4, 1981 
The Monument by David Cregan, as Dr. James Short, BBC Radio 3, 1978 
Where Are They Now? by Tom Stoppard, as an Old Boy, 1971 
If You're Glad, I'll be Frank by Tom Stoppard, as Frank, 1966 
Macbeth, as the Porter, BBC Third Programme, 1966. Repeated on BBC Radio 4 in 1967 and BBC 7 in 2007

Audiobooks
Timothy West has read many unabridged audiobooks, including the complete Barchester Chronicles and the complete Palliser novels by Anthony Trollope, and seven of George MacDonald Fraser's The Flashman Papers books. He has received four AudioFile Earphones Awards for his narration.

Books
I'm Here I Think, Where Are You? Letters from a Touring Actor, 1994, .
A Moment Towards the End of the Play (autobiography), 2001, .
So You Want To Be an Actor (with Prunella Scales), 2005, .
Great Canal Journeys: A Lifetime of Memories on Britain's Most Beautiful Waterways, 2017, .

References

External links

LAMDA Biography
Timothy West at Gavin Barker Associates (agent)

1934 births
Commanders of the Order of the British Empire
English male film actors
English male radio actors
English male stage actors
English male soap opera actors
Living people
People associated with the London Academy of Music and Dramatic Art
People educated at Bristol Grammar School
People educated at The John Lyon School
Male actors from Bradford
Royal Shakespeare Company members
English male Shakespearean actors
English male singers
English opera singers
Alumni of the Regent Street Polytechnic
People associated with Conway Hall Ethical Society
20th-century English male actors
21st-century English male actors
Labour Party (UK) people
British waterways activists
Audiobook narrators